Breaking the Fourth Wall is the eighth live album and video by American progressive metal/rock band Dream Theater, recorded live at the Boston Opera House on March 25, 2014, and released on September 29 on CD, DVD, and Blu-ray; the DVD and Blu-ray releases include bonus features. The release was announced by the band on August 21, 2014, and a promotional video featuring the live version of "The Looking Glass" was uploaded to YouTube. Another promotional video featuring the live version of "Strange Déjà Vu" was uploaded on September 15, 2014.

The concert was filmed and directed by Pierre and François Lamoureux, known for their work on most of the concert films by Rush. It features the Berklee College of Music "World Strings" and "Concert Choir" on all songs from "Illumination Theory" onwards.

Breaking the Fourth Wall has been released in a number of formats:
2xDVD
Digital MP3 Album
Blu-ray
Blu-ray + 3xCD
Blu-ray + 3xCD + poster

Customers who pre-ordered the album received an instant download of "The Looking Glass".

Track listing

DVD/Blu-ray 

The Blu-ray release features all songs on one disc, while the DVD release consists of two discs.

Disc 1
"The Enemy Inside"
"The Shattered Fortress"
"On the Backs of Angels"
"The Looking Glass"
"Trial of Tears"
"Enigma Machine" (with drum solo by Mike Mangini)
"Along for the Ride"
"Breaking All Illusions"
Disc 2
"The Mirror"
"Lie"
"Lifting Shadows Off a Dream"
"Scarred"
"Space-Dye Vest"
"Illumination Theory"
"Overture 1928"
"Strange Déjà Vu"
"The Dance of Eternity"
"Finally Free"

Single Disc
"The Enemy Inside"
"The Shattered Fortress"
"On the Backs of Angels"
"The Looking Glass"
"Trial of Tears"
"Enigma Machine" (with drum solo by Mike Mangini)
"Along for the Ride"
"Breaking All Illusions"
"The Mirror"
"Lie"
"Lifting Shadows Off a Dream"
"Scarred"
"Space-Dye Vest"
"Illumination Theory"
"Overture 1928"
"Strange Déjà Vu"
"The Dance of Eternity"
"Finally Free"

CD

Personnel
Dream Theater
James LaBrie – lead vocals
John Petrucci – guitars, backing vocals
Jordan Rudess – keyboards, Continuum, iPad apps, Seaboard
John Myung – bass, Moog Taurus pedals
Mike Mangini – drums, percussion

Guest Musicians 
Berklee College of Music orchestra and choir 
Eren Başbuğ – orchestral arrangements, conducting

DVD Credits
Pierre Lamoureux – director
François Lamoureux – director
Denis Normandeau – Recording Engineer
Albert Chambers – Recording Engineer
Martin Julien – editor
Richard Chycki – mixing, mastering
Hugh Syme - cover art

Charts

Album charts

Video charts

References

Dream Theater video albums
Dream Theater live albums
2014 live albums